Alexei Cracan is a diplomat from the Republic of Moldova. He is the Moldovan Ambassador to Latvia. Cracan was born March 17, 1960, Danu, Glodeni, Republic of Moldova.

His predecessor, Eduard Melnic,  was the first Ambassador of Moldova to Latvia.

References

External links
 Alexei Cracan, director adjunct pentru afaceri consulare în Ministerul de externe de la Chişinău, pune actualul blocaj al vizelor pe seama unor chestiuni de protocol diplomatic
 Dombrovskis expressed acknowledgement to Ambassador of Moldova to Latvia for his contribution in developing bilateral relations

1960 births
Living people
Ambassadors of Moldova to Latvia